Wright Pass is a snow pass to the west of Jones Bluffs, running north–south for 3 nautical miles (6 km) between the terminus of Holt Glacier and the vicinity of Mayo Peak, Bear Peninsula on the Walgreen Coast, Marie Byrd Land. Mapped by United States Geological Survey (USGS) from U.S. Navy aerial photographs taken 1966. Named by Advisory Committee on Antarctic Names (US-ACAN) in 1977 after  Chief Petty Officer William L. Wright, U.S. Navy, who completed six Operation Deepfreeze deployments up to 1977. As Leading Petty Officer (Transportation Operations), he conducted cargo traverses across the ice of McMurdo Sound to the McMurdo Dry Valleys.

References

Mountain passes of Antarctica
Landforms of Marie Byrd Land